In vector calculus, a Laplacian vector field is a vector field which is both irrotational and incompressible.  If the field is denoted as v, then it is described by the following differential equations:

From the vector calculus identity  it follows that

that is, that the field v satisfies Laplace's equation.

However, the converse is not true; not every vector field that satisfies Laplace's equation is a Laplacian vector field, which can be a point of confusion. For example, the vector field  satisfies Laplace's equation, but it has both nonzero divergence and nonzero curl and is not a Laplacian vector field.

A Laplacian vector field in the plane satisfies the Cauchy–Riemann equations: it is holomorphic.

Since the curl of v is zero, it follows that (when the domain of definition is simply connected) v can be expressed as the gradient of a scalar potential (see irrotational field) φ :

Then, since the divergence of v is also zero, it follows from equation (1) that 

which is equivalent to

Therefore, the potential of a Laplacian field satisfies Laplace's equation.

See also
 Potential flow
 Harmonic function

Vector calculus